Glišić is a Serbian surname. In Macedonian, it is spelled Glishikj. It may refer to:

 Darko Glishikj (born 1991), Macedonian footballer
 Ivan Glišić (born 1942), Serbian writer and journalist
 Milovan Glišić (1847–1908), Serbian writer and translator
 Nikola Glišić (born 1999), Serbian footballer

Macedonian-language surnames
Serbian surnames